Kelow Valley is a valley in the U.S. state of Missouri.

Variant names were "Kealo Valley" and "Kelo Valley". The valley has the name of Joseph Kelo, an early citizen.

References

Valleys of Reynolds County, Missouri
Valleys of Wayne County, Missouri
Valleys of Missouri